Crassitoniella carinata is a species of marine gastropod mollusc in the family Eatoniellidae. It was first described by Winston Ponder in 1965, and it is the type species for the genus Crassitoniella. It is endemic to the waters of New Zealand.

Description
Crassitoniella carinata has a distinctive orange-red coloured shell, with a wide protoconch. The living animal has white long tentacles, with large eyes. The species measures 1.91millimetres by 1.3 millimetres.

The species' shell is similar to the Australian species Crassitoniella flammea, but differs by having a uniform colour and distinct peripheral cord.

Distribution
The species is Endemic to New Zealand. The holotype was collected from shell sand found at Piwhane / Spirits Bay in the Northland Region, New Zealand. The species was first documented on the east coast of the North Island as far south as the Bay of Plenty, in 1995 a specimen was first identified on the west coast of the North Island. Additional specimens have ben found in the waters near Manawatāwhi / Three Kings Islands.

References

Further reading
 Spencer, H.G., Marshall, B.A. & Willan, R.C. (2009). Checklist of New Zealand living Mollusca. Pp 196-219. in: Gordon, D.P. (ed.) New Zealand inventory of biodiversity. Volume one. Kingdom Animalia: Radiata, Lophotrochozoa, Deuterostomia. Canterbury University Press, Christchurch

Eatoniellidae
Gastropods described in 1965
Gastropods of New Zealand
Endemic fauna of New Zealand
Endemic molluscs of New Zealand
Molluscs of the Pacific Ocean
Taxa named by Winston Ponder